Project 636.3 RFS Rostov na Donu (B-237) is an improved Kilo-class attack submarine of the Russian Navy.

Ship 
Rostov na Donu is a diesel-electric submarine of the improved Project 636.3 class of modern Russian ships. B-237 was built in Saint Petersburg shipyard, laid down on 21 November 2011, launched on 26 June 2014 and commissioned at 30 December 2014.

Operation 
The submarine is part of the Russian Black Sea Fleet but was deployed in the Mediterranean Sea in the early 2020s. The submarine returned to the Black Sea in February 2022, passing the Bosphorus on February 13. With Rostov na Donu, the Russian Black Sea Fleet has four improved Kilo-class submarines equipped with Kalibr land-attack missiles deployed in the Black Sea as of February 2022, with at least three of those four Improved Kilo-class boats believed to be active.

References

2014 ships
Submarines of Russia
Kilo-class submarines
Attack submarines